The 2014 Ontario Scotties Tournament of Hearts, the provincial women's curling championship for Ontario, was held from January 6 to 12 at the Soo Curlers Association in Sault Ste. Marie, Ontario. The winning team represented Ontario at the 2014 Scotties Tournament of Hearts in Montreal.

The event marked the final tournament to include teams from Northern Ontario, which began to have its own entry into the Scotties beginning in 2015.

Qualification Process
Ten teams qualify for the provincial tournament through several methods. Four teams qualified from Northern Ontario, two teams qualified from Regions 1 and 2, two teams qualified from regions 3 and 4 and two teams qualified from the Challenge Round.

The defending champion Rachel Homan did not need to participate in the qualification process, as she won the 2013 Scotties Tournament of Hearts and therefore represented Team Canada at the 2014 Scotties Tournament of Hearts.

Teams

Round-robin standings
Final round-robin standings

Round-robin results

Draw 1
Monday, January 6, 7:00 pm

Draw 3
Tuesday, January 7, 7:00 pm

Draw 4
Wednesday, January 8, 1:00 pm

Draw 5
Wednesday, January 8, 7:00 pm

Draw 6
Thursday, January 9, 9:00 am

Draw 7
Thursday, January 9, 1:00 pm

Draw 2
Friday, January 10, 9:00 am

The draw was postponed due to mechanical issues.

Draw 8
Friday, January 10, 2:00 pm

Draw 9
Friday, January 10, 7:30 pm

Playoffs

1 vs. 2
Saturday, January 11, 2:00 pm

3 vs. 4
Saturday, January 11, 7:00 pm

Semifinal
Sunday, January 12, 9:30 am

Final
Sunday, January 12, 4:00 pm

Qualification
Southern Ontario zones ran from November 22-December 8, 2013. Two teams from each zone qualify to 2 regional tournaments, and two teams from each of the two tournaments qualify to provincials. Two additional teams qualify out of a second chance qualifier.

The Northern Ontario provincial championship occur from December 13 to 15 in 2013 at the Soo Curlers Association in Sault Ste. Marie, Ontario. Four teams qualify out of the Northern Ontario championship.

Regional Qualifiers In Bold

Southern Ontario Zone Qualification

Zone 1
December 6–8, at the RCMP Curling Club, Ottawa

Teams entered:
Katie Morrissey (Ottawa) (automatically qualifies as only team)

Zone 2
December 6–8, at the RCMP Curling Club, Ottawa

Teams entered:

Laura Payne (Rideau) (qualifies due to lack of entries in Zone 1)
Samantha Peters (Rideau)
Jacqueline Lavoie (Rideau)
Rhonda Varnes (Rideau)

Zone 3
December 7, at the Carleton Heights Curling Club, Ottawa

Teams entered:

Brit O'Neill (City View)
Lauren Mann (Pakenham)

Both teams qualify as there were no other entries.

Zone 4
December 8, at the Trenton Curling Club, Trenton

Teams entered:

Lindsay McKeown (Cataraqui)
Lisa Farnell (Loonie)

Both teams qualify as there were no other entries.

Zone 5
December 7 at the Lindsay Curling Club, Lindsay

Teams entered:

Angie Melaney (Lakefield)
Julie O'Neill (Lindsay)
Emma Joyce (Lindsay) (qualifies due to lack of entries in Zone 6)

Zone 6
December 7–8 Port Perry Community Curling Club, Port Perry

Teams entered:

Susan McKnight (Uxbridge) (automatically qualifies as only team)

Zone 7
November 23–24, at the Thornhill Country Club, Thornhill

Teams entered:

Julie Hastings (Bayview)
Hollie Nicol (Donalda) (qualifies due to lack of entries in Zone 8)
Courtney de Winter (Richmond Hill)
Chrissy Cadorin (Thornhill)

Zone 8
November 23–24 at the Mississaugua Golf & Country Club, Mississauga

Cathy Auld (Mississaugua) (automatically qualifies as only team)

Zone 9
December 7–8, at the Milton Curling Club, Milton

Teams entered:

Heather Graham (King)
Marika Bakewell (Markdale)

Both teams qualify as there were no other entries.

Zone 10
November 23 at the Penetanguishene Curling Club, Penetanguishene

Teams entered:

Joanne Gill (Parry Sound)
Sarah Picton (Stroud)
Sherry Middaugh (Coldwater)

Zone 11
November 22–24 at the Meaford Curling Club, Meaford

Teams entered:

Julie Reddick (Blue Water) (automatically qualifies as only team)

Zone 12
December 7 at the Fergus Curling Club, Fergus

Teams entered:
Kristy Russell (Elora)
Sheri Smeltzer (Fergus)
Taylor Mellor (Kitchener-Waterloo Granite)
Jen Spencer (Westmount) (qualifies due to lack of entries in Zone 11)

Zone 13
December 8, at the Glendale Golf & Country Club, Hamilton

Teams entered:

Michelle Fletcher (Burlington)
Ashley Waye (Glendale)

Both teams qualify as there were no other entries.

Zone 14
December 8, at the Palmerston Curling Club, Palmerston

Teams entered:

Jamiee Gardner (Listowel)
Allison Flaxey (Listowel)

Both teams qualify as there were no other entries.

Zone 15
December 7, at the St. Thomas Curling Club, St. Thomas

Teams entered:

Jacqueline Harrison (Brant)
Chantal Lalonde (Woodstock)
Heather Carr-Olmstead (Norwich)

Zone 16
December 6–8, at the Sun Parlour Curling Club, Leamington

Teams entered:
Dianne Dykstra (Chatham-Granite)
Bethany Heinrichs (Ilderton)

Both teams qualify as there were no other entries.

Regions 1 & 2
December 13–15 at the Cataraqui Golf & Country Club, Kingston

{{6TeamBracket
| RD1=B Side (Top half)
| RD2= 
| RD3= 
| RD4= 
|team-width= 170px

| RD1-seed1= 6B
| RD1-team1= Emma Joyce
| RD1-score1= 4
| RD1-seed2= 5B
| RD1-team2= Julie O'Neill
| RD1-score2= 9| RD1-seed3= 3A
| RD1-team3= Lauren Mann| RD1-score3= 10| RD1-seed4= 4A
| RD1-team4= Lindsay McKeown
| RD1-score4= 3

| RD2-seed1= 4B
| RD2-team1= Lisa Farnell| RD2-score1=9| RD2-seed2= 5B
| RD2-team2= Julie O'Neill
| RD2-score2=3

| RD2-seed3= 2B
| RD2-team3= Samantha Peters
| RD2-score3= 4
| RD2-seed4= 3A
| RD2-team4= Lauren Mann| RD2-score4= 8| RD3-seed1=4B
| RD3-team1= Lisa Farnell
| RD3-score1= 2
| RD3-seed2= 3A
| RD3-team2= Lauren Mann| RD3-score2= 9}}

Regions 3 & 4
December 14–16, Guelph Curling Club, Guelph.

Challenge Round
December 20–22, Bradford & District Curling Club, Bradford

Northern Ontario Provincials
The Northern Ontario provincial championship was held from December 13–15 at the Soo Curlers Association in Sault Ste. Marie.

Round-robin standingsScores'''
Kallos 6-4 Lilly
Horgan 10-6 Fossum
Premo 7-5 Fossum
Horgan 7-5 Lilly
Horgan 9-8 Kallos
Lilly 8-3 Premo
Lilly 9-5 Forrum
Kallos 7-5 Premo
Horgan 9-3 Premo
Kallos 10-4 Fossum

References

External links

Results at Playdowns.com
Results at Curlingzone.com

Ontario
Sport in Sault Ste. Marie, Ontario
Ontario Scotties Tournament of Hearts